Deir el-Gabrawi is a village in Upper Egypt. It is located on the east bank of the Nile, directly east of the city of Manfalut, in the Asyut Governorate.

Ancient necropolis

During the 6th Dynasty, the powerful nomarchs of the 12th nome of Upper Egypt were buried in rock-cut tombs near Deir El Gabrawi. Some of these nomarchs held the title Great Overlord of the Abydene Nome, and so controlled a large area extending from the 8th nome (Abydos) to the 13th nome of Upper Egypt.

It is remarkable that some scenes in the tomb of one of these nomarchs, Ibi, occur again in the Theban tomb (TT36) of a man of the same name from the reign of Psammetichus I, about 1600 years later.

See also
List of ancient Egyptian sites, including sites of temples

Populated places in Asyut Governorate